The NUST Institute of Civil Engineering, commonly known by its acronym NICE, was founded by the National University of Sciences and Technology, Pakistan in 2009. It offers undergraduate and postgraduate programs in Civil Engineering including Structural Engineering, Geotechnical Engineering, Transportation Engineering, Water Resource Engineering & Management and Geotechnical & Tunneling Engineering.

NICE is a constituent institute of NUST School of Civil and Environmental Engineering which itself is a constituent school of National University of Sciences and Technology, Pakistan.

See also
NUST School of Civil and Environmental Engineering
National University of Sciences and Technology, Pakistan
Institute of Geographical Information System
Institute of Environmental Sciences and Engineering

References

External links
 NICE official website
 NUST School of Civil and Environmental Engineering official website
 NUST official website

National University of Sciences & Technology
Engineering universities and colleges in Pakistan